The 2022–23 FC Schalke 04 season is the 119th season in the football club's history and first consecutive and 54th overall season in the top flight of German football, the Bundesliga, having been promoted from the 2. Bundesliga in 2022. In addition to the domestic league, Schalke also participates in this season's edition of the domestic cup, the DFB-Pokal. This is the 22nd season for Schalke in the Veltins-Arena, located in Gelsenkirchen, North Rhine-Westphalia. The season covers a period from 1 July 2022 to 30 June 2023.

Players
Note: Players' appearances and goals only in their Schalke career.

Transfers

In

Out

Friendly matches

Competitions

Overview

Bundesliga

League table

Results summary

Results by round

Matches

DFB-Pokal

Statistics

Squad statistics

Goalscorers

Clean sheets

References

FC Schalke 04 seasons
Schalke